Brush the Scar Lemon (stylized as BRUSH the SCAR LEMON) is the third album of Japanese rock band, Granrodeo. It was released on 28 October 2009.

Song Information 
 "tRANCE" was used as the 2nd opening theme to the 2009 anime television Black God (manga).
 "modern strange cowboy" was used as the 1st opening theme to the 2009 anime television "Needless".
 Songs "Tsuki ni Neko" and "SUGAR" were added as insert songs for the single "Darlin'"
 "Canary" was used as the 1st opening theme to the 2013 anime television Senyu Dai 2 Ki, the second season of Senyu

Track listing

Personnel 
 Kishow: vocals, lyrics
 E-Zuka: lead guitar, backing vocals, Arranging

Cover 
"modern strange cowboy" was covered by FLOW respectively, on the 2020 Granrodeo tribute album Rodeo Freak.

Charts

References
Official mobile site
 初回限定盤
 通常盤

2009 albums
Granrodeo albums